Tarnogsky Gorodok is an airport in Russia located 2 km northeast of the selo of Tarnogsky Gorodok, the center of Tarnogsky District in Vologda Oblast.  It is a small civilian airfield, with small parking apron. The airport is defunct.

References

Defunct airports
Airports built in the Soviet Union
Airports in Vologda Oblast